Omicron is a 1963 Italian science fiction-comedy film directed by Ugo Gregoretti. The plot of the 1963 movie Omicron is of an alien taking over the body of an Earthling (a deceased factory worker who is resurrected) in order to learn about The Planet Earth and threatens the human kind. The film entered the competition at the 24th Venice International Film Festival.

Cast 
 Renato Salvatori as Trabucco - Omicron 
 Rosemary Dexter as Lucia 
 Gaetano Quartararo as Midollo 
 Mara Carisi as Mrs. Midollo

References

External links

1963 films
Films directed by Ugo Gregoretti
Films scored by Piero Umiliani
1960s science fiction comedy films
Italian science fiction comedy films
1963 comedy films
1960s Italian-language films
1960s Italian films